Anna Leonidovna Kovalchuk (born 15 June 1977) is a Russian actress. The winner of the prize for the presentation of the image of "good character" in the international legal Festival "Law and Society" for the title role in the television series Secrets of Investigation.

Biography
Anna Kovalchuk was born on 15 June 1977, in Neustrelitz (GDR), into a family of hereditary teachers. Anna's mother managed a kindergarten, her father was in the military, and her grandfather was the principal. Anna has an older brother named Pavel.

During her school days, Kovalchuk lived in Leningrad. The future actress also spent parts of her childhood in Yerevan and Moscow. At school the exact sciences, in particular mathematics, were her favorite subjects. Upon termination of secondary school, Kovalchuk intended to enroll in the Leningrad Polytechnical Institute toward a career in cybernetics. But after a time, she instead chose an acting career and enrolled in the Leningrad Theatrical Institute of Music and Cinematography (the Ampere-second course. Shvedersky) During her theatrical studies, Anna got acquainted with her future first husband, Anatoly Ilchenko. While still a student, she became involved in a theatre troupe called Lensoveta where director Gennady Trostjanetsky was searching for an actress to play the young heroine for his production of «Imaginary Patient» based on Molière's comedy Le Malade imaginaire. The premiere of her performance took place almost at once after Kovulchuk received her diploma, and almost simultaneously with her wedding.

Career 
Graduated from St. Petersburg Academy of Theatre, Music and Cinema in 1998.

Member of Lensoveta Theatre since 1998. Plays leading roles in stage productions of Lensoveta Theatre.

Anna's general popularity came after the role of inspector Maria Shvetsova in a teleserial of Tainy Sledstviya (Secrets of the Investigation) (2001) for which the actress won a prize for embodiment of an image of "hero" on the international legal film festival «the Law and a society».

After shooting of the first series of "Secrecy of the Investigation", it was revealed that the actress was pregnant and about to give birth. After considering and weighing this situation, the filmmakers decided not to hide Kovalchuk's pregnancy; and script writer Elena Topilsky urgently adapted the script as it concerned the private life of its heroine, Masha Shvetsova's inspector, to include this development.  On 26 October 2000, the actress gave birth to Ilchenko's and her daughter, Zlata (meaning "Gold" in Russian); and the scene of sorts and her breast-feeding her baby were subsequently included in the teleserial.

In 2005 Anna Kovalchuk starred as Margarita in the highly acclaimed Vladimir Bortko-directed Russian television miniseries The Master and Margarita, a screen version of the epic Russian novel by Mikhail Bulgakov.

Private life 
In 2000 Anna gave birth to a daughter and called her Zlata.

The role of Margarita brought Kovalchuk great popularity. Upon conclusion of the filming of «Master and Margarita» in June 2005, Kovalchuk announced her divorce from Anatoly Ilchenko.  Her words were confirmed by her ex-husband, who also acted in the miniseries.

Soon thereafter, Kovulchuk began dating businessman Oleg Kapustin. After two years of relations, they married on 1 December 2007, in St. Petersburg. As a wedding gift, Oleg presented her with a thoroughbred racehorse. On 30 April 2010, the actress gave birth to the couple's son, Dobrynja.

Selected filmography
 1998 Shallow Hal as princess
 2000–2018 Tainy Sledstviya (TV Series) as Maria Shvetsova
 2003 Peculiarities of National Politics
 2004 Against the stream (TV Series) as Anna
 2004 Usad'ba (The Manor) (TV Series) as Elena Semenova
 2005 The Master and Margarita (Miniseries) as Margarita
 2006 Rhymes with love as Olga
 2006 Rush Hour as Evgenya Arkhipova
 2008 Admiral as Sofia Kolchak
 2008 Can I call you mom? as Daria Semenova
 2009 Admiral (TV series) as Sofia Kolchak
 2009 And there was war as Elizabeth
 2009 Personal File captain Ryumin (TV series) as Lisa
 2011 Peter the Great: The Testament (Miniseries) as Anastasia Trubetskaya 
 2016 About love as Tamara

References

External links 
 
 Anna Kovalchuk bio at Lifeactor.ru 

1977 births
Living people
Russian film actresses
Russian stage actresses
Russian television actresses
20th-century Russian actresses
21st-century Russian actresses
Honored Artists of the Russian Federation
People's Artists of Russia